Cyphosperma trichospadix (trichospadix being derived from the Greek words for "hair" and "spadix," an allusion to the hirsute spathe of the inflorescence) is a species of evergreen flowering plant in the family Arecaceae. It is endemic to Fiji, currently threatened by habitat loss, and thus extremely rare in cultivation.

Habitat

Physical characteristics
Its fruits are oval, no more than 2 cm long, and pale yellow when ripe.

References

 Lee Riffle, Robert, and Paul Craft. The Tropical Look, An Encyclopedia of Cultivated Palms. Portland: Timber Press, 2003.  The Tropical Look, An Encyclopedia of Cultivated Palms, pages 318-319
 The Palm and Cycad Societies of Australia. 31 Oct. 2008. PACSOA. 12 July 2009.  

trichospadix
Trees of Fiji
Endemic flora of Fiji
Vulnerable plants
Taxonomy articles created by Polbot
Taxa named by Max Burret